Davenport College (colloquially referred to as D'port) is one of the fourteen residential colleges of Yale University. Its buildings were completed in 1933  mainly in the Georgian style but with a gothic façade along York Street. The college was named for John Davenport, who founded Yale's home city of New Haven, Connecticut.  An extensive renovation of the college's buildings occurred during the 2004–2005 academic year as part of Yale's comprehensive building renovation project. Davenport College has an unofficial rivalry with adjoining Pierson College.

Namesake

John Davenport was born in 1597 to draper and Mayor of Coventry Henry Davenport and Winifred Barnaby.  He attended Oxford University for three years starting in 1613 before leaving without a degree.  He returned to Oxford to finish his MA and Bachelor of Divinity after serving as the chaplain of Hilton Castle and vicar of St. Stephen's Church in London.  In 1633 he resigned from the Church of England after several disputes with the senior clergy.

In 1638 he sailed to North America with his congregation and a patent for a colony in Massachusetts. One year later he co-founded the city of New Haven with Theophilus Eaton and served as its burgess until his departure to Boston 30 years later. Beginning in the 1640s, Davenport advocated for the creation of a college near the New Haven Green, a vision realized by Yale College some fifty years after his death.  He is also credited with co-founding the nearby Hopkins School.

In 1668, Davenport left New Haven to serve as the pastor of the First Church in Boston.  His invitation to that position was not without opposition due to his strict Puritan values, especially regarding infant baptism.  Davenport died of apoplexy less than two years later.

Buildings and architecture

The College

Davenport College was, like many of Yale's residential colleges, designed by James Gamble Rogers. It has two distinct styles of architecture: The York Street facade is constructed from gothically-detailed sandstone while the remainder of the college has been built in the red-brick Georgian style of the colonial era.  This "hybridization" is meant to complement the monumental gothic streetscape of York Street, on which the western façades of the Branford and Saybrook College complex along with Jonathan Edwards College stand opposite the gothic-inspired Yale Daily News building and University Theater. On the inner, Georgian face, the college entrance has an adaptation of the eastern façade of the original Massachusetts Statehouse, in which the British imperial lion and unicorn have been replaced by a pair of yales. The inner face was featured in the 2008 movie The Sisterhood of the Traveling Pants 2.

The enclosed space of Davenport College features three courtyards: Kumble Court (usually referred to as the "upper courtyard"), the lower courtyard and a recently created stone courtyard in front of the dean's suite, the result of the annexation of the former Yale Record building during the 2004–2005 renovations. A half-story terrace and two house-like residential units (one dubbed "The Cottage") flank the upper courtyard to the north. Traditionally, the college's sophomores live in the suites bordering the lower courtyard, while most of the juniors and seniors of the College live around the upper courtyard.

Separating the two main courtyards is the Crosspiece, housing both the Dean's and Head's Offices and a classroom space as well as carrels and reading rooms extending from the college's Spitzer Library. The Crosspiece formerly held a second library in the top floor which has since been converted to student housing, with the book holdings moved into the expanded Library. Indoor spaces of architectural note include the Davenport Common Room, the aforementioned Spitzer Library and the Dining Hall. The Dining Hall's walls are adorned with a two-panel portrait showcasing the diversity of the college's staff and students. A Waterford crystal chandelier hangs from the dining hall's ceiling.

The student buttery, or "The Dive", is the snack shop. An entertainment center—and game room is nearby. The Davenport basement also includes a letterpress print-shop, a pottery studio, a digital media arts center, a dance studio, and a small theater with stadium seating. These are all shared with students in Pierson. Davenport students also have access to shared facilities on the Pierson side of the basement, including music practice rooms and an exercise room containing treadmills, ellipticals, and free weights.

Freshman housing

Davenport College freshmen live on the Old Campus with the rest of their Yale College class, with the exception of students from Silliman, Timothy Dwight, Pauli Murray, and Benjamin Franklin. Currently, Davenport College freshmen live in Welch Hall, which is located next to Phelps Gate.  Welch is known for the 10- and 12-pack suites on the bottom floor (for 10 and 12 students) and the princess suites on the top two floors, complete with cathedral ceilings and skylights.

History 

Under the Yale College policy that let incoming students express a residential college preference, Davenport developed a reputation for attracting athletic, upper-class elites until the policy ended with the class of 1958.

In July 2022, Anjelica Gonzalez will succeed John Fabian Witt, making her the first Black woman to serve as Head of College in Yale's history.

Mascot

For a while after Davenport College's inception into the Yale residential college system, students were known as "Hybrids," a reference to the hybrid style of the college's architecture. While the nickname appeared in a few official publications in the 1970s, it was no longer used by either Davenporters or their rivals.  Davenport students were without a title or figure to rally behind.

In 1998, then junior Thomas Shaw, upon returning from a semester of mountaineering, brought back from the California Redwood country a five-and-a-half foot tall, 400 pound carved wooden gnome as a gift to the college. The gnome, with its green painted shirt and yellow pants, quickly developed a following in the Davenport community, and was soon proudly adopted as the college's official mascot.

The gnome was first placed in the college's courtyard, but after repeated theft by neighbor and unofficial Davenport rival Pierson, the gnome was relocated inside. It was in the entrance of the administrative offices in Crosspiece for the first semester of the 2005–2006 school year, but was moved to the Davenport Dining Hall. In April 2011, Davenport students stopped a group of Piersonites from the most recent attempt at stealing the gnome. The gnome was successfully rescued and taken to its home in the Davenport Dining Hall.

Intramurals

Davenport College has competed for the Tyng Cup, winning the championship 4 times.  The college's ice hockey team has won 16 championships, most recently in 1997.  Davenport is the current coed football champion and has won championships in table tennis, golf, bowling, men's volleyball, swimming, softball, and track and field in the past 5 years.

Notable alumni

Sherrod Brown, 1974, United States Senator (D-Ohio)
Barbara Bush, daughter of President George W. Bush
George H. W. Bush, 1948, 41st President of the United States
George W. Bush, 1968, 43rd President of the United States
William F. Buckley, Jr., prominent conservative columnist, founder of the National Review
Ben Carson, 1973, neurosurgeon, 2016 Republican presidential candidate, former Secretary of U.S. Department of Housing and Urban Development
Michael Gerber, humorist and author
Jonathan Haidt, social psychologist and author
Rashid Khalidi, Palestinian-American academic and diplomat
Michael J. Knowles, 2012, conservative political commentator, author, and media host
Sarah Lyall, London correspondent for The New York Times
Robert K. Massie, historian, winner of 1981 Pulitzer Prize in biography
Jefferson Mays, Tony Award-winning actor
David McCullough, American historian and best-selling author
Edwin Meese, 75th Attorney General of the United States
Karen Narasaki, a civil rights leader and a Commissioner on the United States Commission on Civil Rights
John D. Negroponte, 1960, former ambassador to Honduras and Iraq, and former permanent representative to the United Nations
Samantha Power, United States Ambassador to the United Nations
Clark T. Randt, Jr., the longest-serving United States Ambassador to China
Kurt Schmoke, Dean of Howard University Law School, former mayor of Baltimore, and former Senior Fellow of Yale University
Stephen Schwarzman, 1969, investor and founder of The Blackstone Group
Ari Shapiro, 2000, an American radio journalist
Garry Trudeau, artist/writer of Doonesbury comic strip
Sam Tsui, YouTube musician and Internet celebrity
Thornton Wilder, American playwright and novelist

References

External links
Davenport Pops Orchestra

Residential colleges of Yale University
University and college dormitories in the United States